APEC Vietnam 2006 was a series of political meetings held around Vietnam between the 21 member economies of the Asia-Pacific Economic Cooperation during 2006. Various meetings were held across Vietnam in 2006. Leaders from all the member countries met from 18 to 19 November 2006 in Hanoi. Notable objectives that APEC Vietnam 2006 aimed to achieve included advancing free trade and investments, enhancing human security and building stronger societies and a more dynamic and harmonious community. The theme surrounding this APEC meeting was towards a dynamic community for sustainable development and prosperity.

References

External links

2006 in Vietnam
History of Hanoi
2006
Diplomatic conferences in Vietnam
21st-century diplomatic conferences (Asia-Pacific)
2006 in international relations
2006 conferences
November 2006 events in Asia
21st century in Hanoi